Richie Rich (stylized as Ri¢hie Ri¢h) is a 1994 American comedy film directed by Donald Petrie and based on the comic character of the same name created by Alfred Harvey and Warren Kremer. The film was distributed by Warner Bros. under their Warner Bros. Family Entertainment label. The film stars Macaulay Culkin (in his final film as a child actor until he began work as an adult actor in 2003), John Larroquette, Edward Herrmann, Jonathan Hyde, and Christine Ebersole, while Reggie Jackson, Claudia Schiffer, and Ben Stein appear in cameo roles. Culkin's younger brother, Rory Culkin, played the part of Young Richie Rich. In theaters, the film was shown with a Wile E. Coyote and the Road Runner cartoon called Chariots of Fur, and it was followed by the 1998 direct-to-video sequel Richie Rich's Christmas Wish.

Plot
Richard "Richie" Rich, Jr. is "the world's richest boy", living in Chicago with his billionaire parents Richard Sr. and Regina. Under the care of his loyal butler Herbert Cadbury, scientist Professor Keenbean, and his dog Dollar, Richie enjoys a luxurious but lonely life. At his father's reopening of the local United Tool factory, Richie sees union rep Diane Koscinski's daughter Gloria and her friends playing sandlot ball, and later tries to befriend them.

Lawrence Van Dough, the greedy CFO of Rich Industries, plots with head of security Ferguson to kill the Riches and steal their fortune, believed to be stored in the family's secret vault. As the Riches prepare for a visit to England, Ferguson plants a bomb among their gifts for the Queen's birthday. Cadbury convinces Regina to let Richie stay home instead, and arranges for a day of fun with the sandlot kids, accompanied by Diane. Though initially bribed by Cadbury, the kids decline the money after genuinely having fun with Richie.

Flying the plane themselves, Richard and Regina discover the bomb just before it explodes, crashing the plane into the ocean. Stranded on a life raft, Richie's parents are presumed dead, and Van Dough takes control of Rich Industries. He attempts to close the factory, prompting Richie to assume leadership of the company himself, with Cadbury as his legal guardian and business proxy. Determined to seize the Riches' fortune, Van Dough has Cadbury framed for the bomb and arrested, and installs his own security team at Rich Manor to keep Richie prisoner.

Overhearing Van Dough's plan to have Cadbury killed in jail, Professor Keenbean warns Richie, who sneaks out and rescues Cadbury. They enlist the help of Gloria and Diane, while Van Dough and Ferguson threaten Keenbean into revealing that the family vault requires a voice-activated code from Richard and Regina. At sea, Richard manages to repair his "Dadlink", a device allowing Richie to track him anywhere in the world. Using Gloria's computer, Richie finds the Dadlink's signal, but Ferguson intercepts the coordinates and captures Richard and Regina.

Richie and Gloria rally the sandlot kids to break into Rich Manor with Cadbury and Diane, using Keenbean's inventions against Van Dough's men. Holding Richard and Regina at gunpoint, Van Dough is led to the vault hidden within "Mount Richmore", their gigantic mountainside family portrait. Inside, he is furious and outraged to discover no money, but what the Riches actually value most: treasured family mementos and heirlooms. Richie confronts Van Dough, who shoots him, but the bullets prove harmless thanks to Keenbean's bulletproof spray. Van Dough pursues the Riches down the side of the mountain, until Cadbury disarms Ferguson and the Riches subdue Van Dough.

Days later, Richie plays baseball with Gloria and his new friends for the United Tool team on Rich Manor's yard, coached by Cadbury, who shares a kiss with Diane. Van Dough and Ferguson serve as the manor's gardeners as part of their work release, while Richard and Regina are overjoyed that Richie has finally found what money cannot buy: friends.

Cast
 Macaulay Culkin as Richie Rich
 Rory Culkin as Young Richie Rich
 Peter Lampley as Baby Richie Rich
 John Larroquette as Laurence Van Dough - The greedy CFO of Rich Enterprises, who plots to steal the Rich family fortune.
 Edward Herrmann as Richard Rich Sr
 Christine Ebersole as Regina Rich
 Jonathan Hyde as Herbert Arthur Runcible Cadbury - The Rich family's trustworthy butler.
 Mike McShane as Professor Keenbean - A brilliant inventor who works for Rich Industries.
 Chelcie Ross as Ferguson - The Rich family's rude and tough security chief, who plots with Van Dough to usurp the Rich empire.
 Mariangela Pino as Diane Koscinski
 Stephi Lineburg as Gloria Koscinski
 Michael Maccarone as Tony 
 Joel Robinson as Omar 
 Jonathan Hilario as Pee Wee
 Reggie Jackson as himself - Richie's private baseball coach.
 Matt DeCaro as Dave Walter - The plant manager for United Tool.
 Claudia Schiffer as herself - Richie's private aerobics instructor.
 Ben Stein as Economics Teacher
 Sean A. Tate as Reynolds 
 Joel Ellegant as Ellsworth
 Justin Zaremby as Reginald
 Eddie Bo Smith as Security Guard

Production

Though set in Chicago, the house and grounds at which most of Richie Rich is filmed are those of the Biltmore Estate in Asheville, North Carolina. Some scenes, however, are filmed in Chicago, including a fencing scene filmed at DePaul University's Cortelyou Commons & the Ravenswood Manor neighborhood including the Francisco El Stop on the CTA Brown line. The roller coaster in the backyard is the former stand-up roller coaster Iron Wolf at Six Flags Great America. In contrast to the famous publication and animated series, a few characters are eliminated to accommodate the movie: among them are Irona the robot maid.

Data East was one of few regular pinball companies that manufactured custom pinball games e.g. for the movie Richie Rich. This pinball machine was based on The Who's Tommy Pinball Wizard machine.

Reception
The movie has been met with mixed reception. A Los Angeles Times reviewer praised the actors' portrayal of characters in the film. Roger Ebert gave the film 3 out of 4 stars saying he was surprised how much he enjoyed it and said that though it was not the greatest movie, he liked that it had style and did not go for cheap payoffs. Richie Rich earned a Razzie Award nomination for Macaulay Culkin as Worst Actor for his performance in the movie (also for Getting Even with Dad and The Pagemaster) but lost the award to Kevin Costner for Wyatt Earp.

The movie received a 26% rating on Rotten Tomatoes based on 23 reviews, with the sites critical consensus reading "With Macaulay Culkin barely registering any emotion, Richie Rich feels disjointed and free of a sense of fun and wonderment". Audiences polled by CinemaScore gave the film an average grade of "A-" on an A+ to F scale.

The film grossed $38 million at the box office in the United States and Canada and the same internationally for a worldwide total of $76 million on a $40 million budget. It was an even bigger home video success, with $125 million in VHS rentals and, $44.2 million in retail sales, the studio receiving 75%.

Year-end lists 
 Fifth worst – Sean P. Means, The Salt Lake Tribune

Sequel

Richie Rich's Christmas Wish is a 1998 direct-to-video sequel starring David Gallagher in the titular role.

References

External links

 
 
 
 Films Made in North Carolina - PDF

1994 films
1994 children's films
1994 comedy films
1990s adventure comedy films
1990s children's adventure films
1990s children's comedy films
American adventure comedy films
American children's adventure films
American children's comedy films
Bermuda Triangle in fiction
Davis Entertainment films
1990s English-language films
Films about children
Films scored by Alan Silvestri
Films based on Harvey Comics
Films directed by Donald Petrie
Films produced by Joel Silver
Films produced by John Davis
Films set in Chicago
Films shot in North Carolina
Films with screenplays by Jim Jennewein
Films based on American comics
Live-action films based on comics
Richie Rich (comics)
Richie Rich (film series)
Silver Pictures films
Warner Bros. films
1990s American films